Wilhelm Baumann (12 August 1912 in Berlin – 14 March 1990) was a German field handball player who competed in the 1936 Summer Olympics. He was part of the German field handball team, which won the gold medal. He played two matches including the final.

References

External links
profile

1912 births
1990 deaths
German male handball players
Olympic handball players of Germany
Field handball players at the 1936 Summer Olympics
Olympic gold medalists for Germany
Olympic medalists in handball
Medalists at the 1936 Summer Olympics